Pulsar, in comics, may refer to:

 Pulsar (Marvel Comics), a member of the Shi'ar Imperial Guard
 Pulsar (Plor), a member of the Spaceknights
 Pulsar, a codename of superhero Monica Rambeau
 Pulsar Stargrave, a DC Comics villain

See also
Pulsar (disambiguation)